, stylized as BANDAGE, is a 2010 Japanese independent film directed by Takeshi Kobayashi. It was written and produced by Shunji Iwai. Based on the original novel  by Chika Kan, Iwai adapted it and renamed it Bandage.

The movie title has actually two meanings, a literal one, which is a play on the words "Band Age", because the story takes place in Japan's early 1990s, the boom of indie rock bands. And a figurative one, in which a certain character uses music as a "bandage" to heal the feeling of worthlessness.

Plot
Back in the 1990s, way before the manufactured pop acts we now see on TV, there was a flood of indie rock bands that were televised during talent contests that guaranteed instant fame. Amongst that band boom, a group of young musicians managed to dominate the music scene, a band that shone brightest for a brief moment in time.

Between popularity and talent, they go through various trials and lineup changes in the process. As Lands begins to climb the ladder towards major stardom, tensions within the band rise, they clash with the dark side of music industry, greed and discord surfaces, inevitable frictions emerge, and unrequited love strains their friendship, threatening to pull their bonds apart. These ups and downs are shown from the perspective of Asako, a high school girl who becomes the band's manager through an unexpected coincidence.

Production 
Apart from being Kobayashi's directorial debut, he is also in charge of the music production. The project was originally taken by Ryuhei Kitamura, then dropped in 2006. When filming finally started in late 2008, Kobayashi hand-picked a completely different cast for the movie, casting pop singer and actor Jin Akanishi with actress Kie Kitano for the lead roles.

Music
In addition to the film, Jin Akanishi, who portrays the lead singer of Lands in the movie, collaborated in real life with Takeshi Kobayashi to create the rock band Lands as a temporary unit. On September 5, 2009, they debuted at the fashion event Tokyo Girls Collection, appearing as a special guest, performing the movie's theme song.
Kobayashi wrote most of the lyrics and music of the band, with special collaboration of Shunji Iwai and also Jin Akanishi. Although not an official member, the songs feature actual drummer and actor Nobuaki Kaneko of Rize, who also plays the role of the drummer in the film.

Their first single, "Bandage" was released on November 25, 2009, reaching number one in the Oricon chart. Later on, they also released a studio album titled Olympos in January, 2010, which also ranked number one in the Japanese music charts. During their short life, Lands has had two consecutive number one releases, breaking a Japanese soundtrack record for an album released in the name of a movie character. The only other time in the history of Japanese music this had happened was in 1996, when Kobayashi's Yentown band (made for Shunji Iwai's movie Swallowtail Butterfly) topped the Oricon charts with their album Montage.

Lands held their first and last concert on January 19, 2010, called Lands Last Live in the Tokyo Metropolitan Area.

Cast 
Jin Akanishi as Natsu Takasugi, Lands vocalist
Kie Kitano as Asako Suzuki, a high school student
Kengo Kora as Yukiya Nagato, Lands guitar player
Yuki Shibamoto as Arumi Suzuhata, Lands keyboardist
Hideyuki Kasahara as Kenji Yamane, Lands bass player
Nobuaki Kaneko as Ryuji, Lands drummer
Ayumi Ito as Nobuko Yukari, Lands manager and former musician
Anne Watanabe as Miharu, Asako's friend
Kazuo Zaitsu
Yoshiyuki Ishizuka
Mayu Kitaki
Yoshimasa Kondo as Kokubo
Hatsunori Hasegawa
Yuki Saito
Sogen Tanaka
Kazuma Suzuki as Toda (Long Run Records employee)
Toru Kizu
Natalia Silkina

Details 
The pre-screening was held on November 2, 2009 at the Tokyo International Forum.

The movie sold 70,000 advance tickets on its first day of availability, selling more than the big budget movies of the season ("Gokusen: The Movie" sold 25,000 advance tickets and "20th Century Boys 1: Beginning of the End" sold 2,500 advance tickets), setting a live action film record.

Awards and nominations
2010 (12th) Udine Far East Film - April 23 – May 1 - "My Movies Audience Award"
2010 (23rd) Nikkan Sports Film Awards - December 28, 2010 "Fan Award (Japanese Movie)"
2010 35th Hochi Film Awards - 5 Nominations - Best Actor (Jin Akanishi) and Best Newcomer (Jin Akanishi)

References

External links 
 
 

2010 films
Films based on Japanese novels
Films set in Tokyo
Films set in the 1990s
Japanese independent films
Japanese coming-of-age films
2010s Japanese-language films
2010 directorial debut films
2010s Japanese films